Zebrzydowice is a district of Rybnik, Silesian Voivodeship, southern Poland. On December 31, 2013 it had 3,150 inhabitants.

History 
Before the 17th century the village belonged to Zebrzydowski family.

After World War I in the Upper Silesia plebiscite 332 out of 380 voters in Zebrzydowice voted in favour of joining Poland, against 47 opting for staying in Germany. In 1922 it became a part of Silesian Voivodeship, Second Polish Republic. It was then annexed by Nazi Germany at the beginning of World War II. After the war it was restored to Poland. It was amalgamated with Rybnik in 1973.

References

Districts of Rybnik